Villalengua is a municipality located in the Zaragoza Province, Aragon, Spain. According to the 2004 census (INE), the municipality had a population of 395 inhabitants.

See also
List of municipalities in Zaragoza

References

Municipalities in the Province of Zaragoza